The Alexander Faribault House is a historic house museum in Faribault, Minnesota, United States.  Built in 1853, it was the first wood-frame house constructed in Rice County, Minnesota.  It was built by fur trader Alexander Faribault in the Greek Revival style.  Besides serving as a house, it also served as a civic center, polling place, and a church. The local address of the house is 12 First Avenue, Faribault, MN. The house was listed on the National Register of Historic Places in 1970.

Alexander Faribault, son of Jean Baptiste Faribault, was a contemporary of Henry Hastings Sibley and served as his secretary for a time.  In 1835, Alexander Faribault set up a trading venture at the confluence of the Straight River and the Cannon River.  He had a relationship of mutual respect with the Dakota Indians with whom he traded, even to the degree of sheltering friendly Indians during the Dakota War of 1862.  In 1853, he built a large frame house.  His house reflected his prosperity, with nine bedrooms, a music room, a parlor, a sitting room, an office, a kitchen, a summer kitchen, and a sewing room.  Part of his wealth came from "traders' claims" stemming from the Treaty of Traverse des Sioux, but he was also the proprietor of a sawmill and a flour mill.  In turn, he was generous to the community, donating $3,000 to Bishop Henry Benjamin Whipple for the church and for Shattuck School.  He also donated land for the Seabury Divinity School.  He served as a delegate to the Minnesota Territorial Legislature and remained friends with Henry Mower Rice and Henry Hastings Sibley, even though Rice and Sibley were personal and political enemies.

See also
 National Register of Historic Places listings in Rice County, Minnesota

References

External links
 
 Rice County Historical Society: Alexander Faribault House
 Historic American Buildings Survey: Alexander Faribault House

Buildings and structures in Faribault, Minnesota
Greek Revival church buildings in Minnesota
Greek Revival houses in Minnesota
Historic house museums in Minnesota
Houses completed in 1853
Houses in Rice County, Minnesota
Houses on the National Register of Historic Places in Minnesota
Museums in Rice County, Minnesota
National Register of Historic Places in Rice County, Minnesota